Freyr (Old Norse: 'Lord'), sometimes anglicized as Frey, is a widely attested god in Norse mythology, associated with kingship, fertility, peace, and weather. Freyr, sometimes referred to as Yngvi-Freyr, was especially associated with Sweden and seen as an ancestor of the Swedish royal house. According to Adam of Bremen, Freyr was associated with peace and pleasure, and was represented with a phallic statue in the Temple at Uppsala. According to Snorri Sturluson, Freyr was "the most renowned of the æsir", and was venerated for good harvest and peace.

In the mythological stories in the Icelandic books the Poetic Edda and the Prose Edda, Freyr is presented as one of the Vanir, the son of the god Njörðr and his sister-wife, as well as the twin brother of the goddess Freyja. The gods gave him Álfheimr, the realm of the Elves, as a teething present. He rides the shining dwarf-made boar Gullinbursti, and possesses the ship Skíðblaðnir, which always has a favorable breeze and can be folded together and carried in a pouch when it is not being used. Freyr is also known to have been associated with the horse cult. He also kept sacred horses in his sanctuary at Trondheim in Norway. He has the servants Skírnir, Byggvir and Beyla.

The most extensive surviving Freyr myth relates Freyr's falling in love with the female jötunn Gerðr. Eventually, she becomes his wife but first Freyr has to give away his sword, which fights on its own "if wise be he who wields it." Although deprived of this weapon, Freyr defeats the jötunn Beli with an antler. However, lacking his sword, Freyr will be killed by the fire jötunn Surtr during the events of Ragnarök.

Like other Germanic deities, veneration of Freyr was revived during the modern period through the Heathenry movement.

Name 
The runic form , derived from an earlier , may also be related. Recently, however, an etymology deriving the name of the god from a nominalized form of the Proto-Scandinavian adjective *fraiw(i)a- ('fruitful, generative') has also been proposed. According to linguist Guus Kroonen, "within Germanic, the attestation of ON frjar, frjór, frær, Icel. frjór adj. 'fertile; prolific' < *fraiwa- clearly seems to point to a stem *frai(w)- meaning 'fecund'. Both in form and meaning, fraiwa- ('seed') is reminiscent of Freyr 'fertility deity' < *frauja-. We may therefore consider the possibility that *fraiwa- was metathesized from *frawja-, a collective of some kind." Freyr is also known by nearly a score of other names which describe his attributes and role in religious practice and associated mythology.

Adam of Bremen
Written  1080, one of the oldest written sources on pre-Christian Scandinavian religious practices is Adam of Bremen's Gesta Hammaburgensis ecclesiae pontificum. Adam claimed to have access to first-hand accounts on pagan practices in Sweden. He refers to Freyr with the Latinized name Fricco and mentions that an image of him at Skara was destroyed by the Christian missionary Bishop Egino. Adam's description of the Temple at Uppsala gives some details on the god.

Later in the account Adam states that when a marriage is performed a libation is made to the image of Fricco.

Historians are divided on the reliability of Adam's account.

Prose Edda
When Snorri Sturluson was writing in 13th century Iceland, the indigenous Germanic gods were still remembered although they had not been openly worshiped for more than two centuries.

Gylfaginning
In the Gylfaginning section of his Prose Edda, Snorri introduces Freyr as one of the major gods.

This description has similarities to the older account by Adam of Bremen but the differences are interesting. Adam assigns control of the weather and produce of the fields to Thor but Snorri says that Freyr rules over those areas. Snorri also omits any explicitly sexual references in Freyr's description. Those discrepancies can be explained in several ways. Adam and Snorri were writing with different goals in mind. It is possible that the Norse gods did not have exactly the same roles in Icelandic and Swedish paganism. Either Snorri or Adam may also have had distorted information.

The only extended myth related about Freyr in the Prose Edda is the story of his marriage.

The woman is Gerðr, a beautiful giantess. Freyr immediately falls in love with her and becomes depressed and taciturn. After a period of brooding, he consents to talk to Skírnir, his foot-page. He tells Skírnir that he has fallen in love with a beautiful woman and thinks he will die if he cannot have her. He asks Skírnir to go and woo her for him.

The loss of Freyr's sword has consequences. According to the Prose Edda, Freyr had to fight Beli without his sword, and slew him with an antler. But the result at Ragnarök, the end of the world, will be much more serious. Freyr is fated to fight the fire-giant Surtr, and since he does not have his sword he will be defeated.

Even after the loss of his weapon Freyr still has two magical artifacts, both dwarf-made. One is the ship Skíðblaðnir, which will have favoring breeze wherever its owner wants to go and can also be folded together like a napkin and carried in a pouch. The other is the boar Gullinbursti whose mane glows to illuminate the way for his owner. No myths involving Skíðblaðnir have come down to us but Snorri relates that Freyr rode to Baldr's funeral in a wagon pulled by Gullinbursti.

Skaldic poetry
Freyr is referred to several times in skaldic poetry. In Húsdrápa, partially preserved in the Prose Edda, he is said to ride a boar to Baldr's funeral.

In a poem by Egill Skalla-Grímsson, Freyr is called upon along with Njörðr to drive Eric Bloodaxe from Norway. The same skald mentions in Arinbjarnarkviða that his friend has been blessed by the two gods.

Nafnaþulur
In Nafnaþulur Freyr is said to ride the horse Blóðughófi (Bloody Hoof).

Poetic Edda

Freyr is mentioned in several of the poems in the Poetic Edda. The information there is largely consistent with that of the Prose Edda while each collection has some details not found in the other.

Völuspá
Völuspá, the best known of the Eddic poems, describes the final confrontation between Freyr and Surtr during Ragnarök.

Some scholars have preferred a slightly different translation, in which the sun shines "from the sword of the gods". The idea is that the sword which Surtr slays Freyr with is the "sword of the gods" which Freyr had earlier bargained away for Gerðr. This would add a further layer of tragedy to the myth. Sigurður Nordal argued for this view but the possibility represented by Ursula Dronke's translation above is equally possible.

Grímnismál
Grímnismál, a poem which largely consists of miscellaneous information about the gods, mentions Freyr's abode.

A tooth-gift was a gift given to an infant on the cutting of the first tooth. Since Alfheimr or Álfheimr means "World of Álfar (Elves)" the fact that Freyr should own it is one of the indications of a connection between the Vanir and the obscure Álfar. Grímnismál also mentions that the sons of Ívaldi made Skíðblaðnir for Freyr and that it is the best of ships.

Lokasenna
In the poem Lokasenna, Loki accuses the gods of various misdeeds. He criticizes the Vanir for incest, saying that Njörðr had Freyr with his sister. He also states that the gods discovered Freyr and Freyja having sex together. The god Týr speaks up in Freyr's defense.

Lokasenna also mentions that Freyr has servants called Byggvir and Beyla. They seem to have been associated with the making of bread.

Skírnismál

The courtship of Freyr and Gerðr is dealt with extensively in the poem Skírnismál.
Freyr is depressed after seeing Gerðr. Njörðr and Skaði ask Skírnir to go and talk with him. Freyr reveals the cause of his grief and asks Skírnir to go to Jötunheimr to woo Gerðr for him. Freyr gives Skírnir a steed and his magical sword for the journey.

When Skírnir finds Gerðr he starts by offering her treasures if she will marry Freyr. When she declines he gets her consent by threatening her with destructive magic.

Ynglinga saga

Snorri Sturluson starts his epic history of the kings of Norway with Ynglinga saga, a euhemerized account of the Norse gods. Here Odin and the Æsir are men from Asia who gain power through their prowess in war and Odin's skills. But when Odin attacks the Vanir he bites off more than he can chew and peace is negotiated after the destructive and indecisive Æsir-Vanir War. Hostages are exchanged to seal the peace deal and the Vanir send Freyr and Njörðr to live with the Æsir. At this point the saga, like Lokasenna, mentions that incest was practised among the Vanir.

Odin makes Njörðr and Freyr priests of sacrifices and they become influential leaders. Odin goes on to conquer the North and settles in Sweden where he rules as king, collects taxes and maintains sacrifices. After Odin's death, Njörðr takes the throne. During his rule there is peace and good harvest and the Swedes come to believe that Njörðr controls these things. Eventually Njörðr falls ill and dies.

Freyr had a son named Fjölnir, who succeeds him as king and rules during the continuing period of peace and good seasons. Fjölnir's descendants are enumerated in Ynglingatal which describes the mythological kings of Sweden.

Ögmundar þáttr dytts
The 14th century Icelandic Ögmundar þáttr dytts contains a tradition of how Freyr was transported in a wagon and administered by a priestess, in Sweden. Freyr's role as a fertility god needed a female counterpart in a divine couple (McKinnell's translation 1987):

In this short story, a man named Gunnar was suspected of manslaughter and escaped to Sweden, where Gunnar became acquainted with this young priestess. He helped her drive Freyr's wagon with the god effigy in it, but the god did not appreciate Gunnar and so attacked him and would have killed Gunnar if he had not promised himself to return to the Christian faith if he would make it back to Norway. When Gunnar had promised this, a demon jumped out of the god effigy and so Freyr was nothing but a piece of wood. Gunnar destroyed the wooden idol and dressed himself as Freyr, then Gunnar and the priestess travelled across Sweden where people were happy to see the god visiting them. After a while he made the priestess pregnant, but this was seen by the Swedes as confirmation that Freyr was truly a fertility god and not a scam. Finally, Gunnar had to flee back to Norway with his young bride and had her baptized at the court of Olaf Tryggvason.

Other Icelandic sources
Worship of Freyr is alluded to in several Icelanders' sagas.

The protagonist of Hrafnkels saga is a priest of Freyr. He dedicates a horse to the god and kills a man for riding it, setting in motion a chain of fateful events.

In Gísla saga a chieftain named Þorgrímr Freysgoði is an ardent worshipper of Freyr. When he dies he is buried in a howe.

Hallfreðar saga, Víga-Glúms saga and Vatnsdœla saga also mention Freyr.

Other Icelandic sources referring to Freyr include Íslendingabók, Landnámabók, and Hervarar saga.

Íslendingabók, written  1125, is the oldest Icelandic source that mentions Freyr, including him in a genealogy of Swedish kings. Landnámabók includes a heathen oath to be sworn at an assembly where Freyr, Njörðr, and "the almighty áss" are invoked. Hervarar saga mentions a Yuletide sacrifice of a boar to Freyr.

Gesta Danorum
The 12th Century Danish Gesta Danorum describes Freyr, under the name Frø, as the "viceroy of the gods".

That Freyr had a cult at Uppsala is well confirmed from other sources. The reference to the change in sacrificial ritual may also reflect some historical memory. There is archaeological evidence for an increase in human sacrifices in the late Viking Age though among the Norse gods human sacrifice is most often linked to Odin. Another reference to Frø and sacrifices is found earlier in the work, where the beginning of an annual blót to him is related. King Hadingus is cursed after killing a divine being and atones for his crime with a sacrifice.

The sacrifice of dark-coloured victims to Freyr has a parallel in Ancient Greek religion where the chthonic fertility deities preferred dark-coloured victims to lighter ones.

In book 9, Saxo identifies Frø as the "king of Sweden" (rex Suetiae):

The reference to public prostitution may be a memory of fertility cult practices. Such a memory may also be the source of a description in book 6 of the stay of Starcatherus, a follower of Odin, in Sweden.

Yngvi

A strophe of the Anglo-Saxon rune poem (c. 1100) records that:

Ing was first among the East Danes seen by men

This may refer to the origins of the worship of Ingui in the tribal areas that Tacitus mentions in his Germania as being populated by the Inguieonnic tribes. A later Danish chronicler lists Ingui was one of three brothers that the Danish tribes descended from. The strophe also states that "then he (Ingui) went back over the waves, his wagon behind him" which could connect Ingui to earlier conceptions of the wagon processions of Nerthus and the later Scandinavian conceptions of Freyr's wagon journeys.

Ingui is mentioned also in some later Anglo-Saxon literature under varying forms of his name, such as "For what doth Ingeld have to do with Christ" and the variants used in Beowulf to designate the kings as 'leader of the friends of Ing'. The compound Ingui-Frea (OE) and Yngvi-Freyr (ON) likely refer to the connection between the god and the Germanic kings' role as priests during the sacrifices in the pagan period, as Frea and Freyr are titles meaning 'Lord'.

The Swedish royal dynasty was known as the Ynglings from their descent from Yngvi-Freyr. This is supported by Tacitus, who wrote about the Germans: "In their ancient songs, their only way of remembering or recording the past they celebrate an earth-born god Tuisco, and his son Mannus, as the origin of their race, as their founders. To Mannus they assign three sons, from whose names, they say, the coast tribes are called Ingaevones; those of the interior, Herminones; all the rest, Istaevones".

Archaeological record

Rällinge statuette

In 1904, a Viking Age statuette identified as a depiction of Freyr was discovered on the farm Rällinge in Lunda, Södermanland parish in the province of Södermanland, Sweden. The depiction features a cross-legged seated, bearded male with an erect penis. He is wearing a pointed cap or helmet and stroking his triangular beard. The seven-centimeter-tall statue is displayed at the Swedish Museum of National Antiquities.

Skog tapestry

A part of the Swedish Skog tapestry depicts three figures that have been interpreted as allusions to Odin, Thor, and Freyr, but also as the three Scandinavian holy kings Canute, Eric and Olaf. The figures coincide with 11th century descriptions of statue arrangements recorded by Adam of Bremen at the Temple at Uppsala and written accounts of the gods during the late Viking Age. The tapestry is originally from Hälsingland, Sweden but is now housed at the Swedish Museum of National Antiquities.

Gullgubber

Small pieces of gold foil featuring engravings dating from the Migration Period into the early Viking Age (known as gullgubber) have been discovered in various locations in Scandinavia, at one site almost 2,500. The foil pieces have been found largely on the sites of buildings, only rarely in graves. The figures are sometimes single, occasionally an animal, sometimes a man and a woman with a leafy bough between them, facing or embracing one another. The human figures are almost always clothed and are sometimes depicted with their knees bent. Scholar Hilda Ellis Davidson says that it has been suggested that the figures are taking part in a dance, and that they may have been connected with weddings, as well as linked to the Vanir group of gods, representing the notion of a divine marriage, such as in the Poetic Edda poem Skírnismál; the coming together of Gerðr and Freyr.

Toponyms
Norway
 Freysakr ("Freyr's field") - name of two old farms in Gol and Torpa.
 Freyshof ("Freyr's temple") - name of two old farms in Hole and Trøgstad.
 Freysland ("Freyr's land/field") - name of six old farms in Feda, Halse, Førde, Sogndal, Søgne and Torpa.
 Freyslíð ("Freyr's hill") - name of two old farms in Lunner and Torpa.
 Freysnes ("Freyr's headland") - name of an old farm in Sandnes.
 Freyssetr ("Freyr's farm") - name of two old farms in Masfjorden and Soknedal.
 Freyssteinn ("Freyr's stone") - name of an old farm in Lista.
 Freysteigr ("Freyr's field") - name of an old farm in Ramnes.
 Freysvík ("Freyr's inlet/bay") - name of two old farms in Fresvik and Ullensvang.
 Freysvin ("Freyr's meadow") - name of four old farms in Hole, Lom, Sunnylven and Østre Gausdal.
 Freysvǫllr ("Freyr's field") - name of an old farm in Sør-Odal.
 Freysþveit ("Freyr's thwaite") - name of an old farm in Hedrum.
Sweden
 Fröslunda ("Freyr's grove") - Uppland
 Frösåker ("Freyr's field") - Uppland
 Frösön ("Freyr's island") - Jämtland
 Fröseke ("Freyr's oak forest") - Småland
 Frösve ("Freyr's sanctuary") - Västergötland
 Frösakull ("Freyr's hill") – Halland 
Denmark
 Frøs Herred ("Freyr's Shire") - Southern Jutland

See also

 List of Germanic deities

Notes

References

 Ásgeir Blöndal Magnússon (1989). Íslensk orðsifjabók. Reykjavík: Orðabók Háskólans.
 
 Brodeur, Arthur Gilchrist (tr.) (1916). The Prose Edda by Snorri Sturluson. New York: The American-Scandinavian Foundation. Available online

 
 
 
 
 Elmevik, Lennart (2003). "Freyr, Freyja, och Freyfaxi." Studia Anthroponymica Scandinavica 21, pp. 5-13.
 Eysteinn Björnsson (ed.) (2005). Snorra-Edda: Formáli & Gylfaginning : Textar fjögurra meginhandrita. Published online: GYLFAGINNING
 Finnur Jónsson (1913). Goðafræði Norðmanna og Íslendinga eftir heimildum. Reykjavík: Hið íslenska bókmentafjelag.
 Finnur Jónsson (1931). Lexicon Poeticum. København: S. L. Møllers Bogtrykkeri.
 Guðni Jónsson (ed.) (1949). Eddukvæði : Sæmundar Edda. Reykjavík: Íslendingasagnaútgáfan.
 
 
 Leiren, Terje I. (1999). From Pagan to Christian: The Story in the 12th-Century Tapestry of the Skog Church. Published online:  
 
 
 "Rällinge-Frö" Historiska museet. Retrieved 6 February 2006, from the World Wide Web. Rällinge-Frö
 Sundqvist, Olof (2020). "Freyr." In The Pre-Christian Religions of the North: History and Structures, vol. 3, ch. 43, pp. 1195-1245. Ed. by Jens Peter Schjødt, John Lindow, and Andres Andrén. 4 vols. Turnhout: Brepols.
 Sundqvist, Olof (2013). "On Freyr: The 'Lord' or 'The Fertile One'? Some Comments on the Discussion of Etymology from the Historian of Religions' Point of View." Onoma 48, pp. 11-35.
 Thordeman, Bengt (ed.) (1954) Erik den helige : historia, kult, reliker. Stockholm: Nordisk rotogravyr.
 Thorpe, Benjamin (tr.) (1866). Edda Sæmundar Hinns Froða : The Edda of Sæmund The Learned. (2 vols.) London: Trübner & Co. Available online

Primary sources
 Adam of Bremen (edited by G. Waitz) (1876). Gesta Hammaburgensis Ecclesiae Pontificum. Berlin. Available online Translation of the section on the Temple at Uppsala available at The Temple at Old Uppsala: Adam of Bremen
 
 
 Olrik, J. and H. Ræder (1931). Saxo Grammaticus : Gesta Danorum. Available online

 
 

 
Abundance gods
Æsir
Agricultural gods
Fertility gods
Harvest gods
Killed deities
Light gods
Peace gods
Sky and weather gods
Solar gods
Norse gods
Mythological kings
Mythological kings of Sweden
Mythological rapists
Vanir 
Divine twins